The 1971–72 Yorkshire Cup was the sixty-fourth occasion on which the RFL Yorkshire Cup competition had been held.

Hull Kingston Rovers won the trophy by beating Castleford by the score of 11-7.  The match was played at Belle Vue, in the City of Wakefield, now in West Yorkshire. The attendance was 5,536 and receipts were £1,589. The attendance was a Yorkshire Cup final record, the lowest ever, a record which would never be beaten.
This is the second time in four seasons that Castleford, (who have never won the trophy, to date) finished as runner-up.

Competition and results

Round 1 
Involved  either 6 or 7 matches (with one or two byes) and either 14 or 15 Clubs

Round 2 - Quarter-finals 
Involved 4 matches and 8 clubs

Round 3 – Semi-finals 
Involved 2 matches and 4 clubs

Final

Teams and scorers 

Scoring - Try = three (3) points - Goal = two (2) points - Drop goal = two (2) points

The road to success

Notes and comments 
1 * Leeds did not take part this season due to a dispute with the Yorkshire County Committee.

2 * Bramley and Hull Kingston Rovers proceeded to the second round, whereas Dewsbury did not, however I am unable to find any record of these teams for the  first round. Can anyone help

3 * Belle Vue is the home ground of Wakefield Trinity with a capacity of approximately 12,500. The record attendance was 37,906 on the 21 March 1936 in the Challenge Cup semi-final between Leeds and Huddersfield

General information for those unfamiliar 
The Rugby League Yorkshire Cup competition was a knock-out competition between (mainly professional) rugby league clubs from  the  county of Yorkshire. The actual area was at times increased to encompass other teams from  outside the  county such as Newcastle, Mansfield, Coventry, and even London (in the form of Acton & Willesden).

The Rugby League season always (until the onset of "Summer Rugby" in 1996) ran from around August-time through to around May-time and this competition always took place early in the season, in the Autumn, with the final taking place in (or just before) December (The only exception to this was when disruption of the fixture list was caused during, and immediately after, the two World Wars)

See also 
 1971–72 Northern Rugby Football League season
 Rugby league county cups

References

External links
 Saints Heritage Society
 1896–97 Northern Rugby Football Union season at wigan.rlfans.com
 Hull&Proud Fixtures & Results 1896/1897
 Widnes Vikings - One team, one passion Season In Review - 1896-97
 The Northern Union at warringtonwolves.org

1971 in English rugby league
RFL Yorkshire Cup